Pokuplje is the name for the Kupa river basin in Croatia. Major settlements are Karlovac, Sisak, Petrinja, Glina and Topusko.

Sources
 Pokuplje at enciklopedija.hr 

Regions of Croatia
Geography of Karlovac County
Geography of Sisak-Moslavina County